Corpoelec is a fully integrated state power corporation of Venezuela. It was created in 2007 by merging ten state-owned and six private-owned power companies. , the president of the company, since 2015, is Luis Motta Domínguez, the Minister of Electricity and general of the Venezuelan Army.

See also

Electricity sector in Venezuela

References

External links
 Official website 
 Venezuelanalysis.com, 11 August 2010, A worker-run energy plan in Venezuela

Electric power companies of Venezuela
Venezuelan companies established in 2007
Energy companies established in 2007
Venezuelan brands